The fifth season of House of Cards, an American political drama television series created by Beau Willimon for Netflix, was released on May 30, 2017. Frank Pugliese and Melissa James Gibson took over as showrunners in place of Willimon, who departed the series. The fifth season follows Frank and Claire Underwood (Kevin Spacey and Robin Wright) and their attempt to win the 2016 Presidential Election against Republican Party nominee Will Conway (Joel Kinnaman). The Underwoods are also faced with mounting insubordination from staff and congressional colleagues as the threat of impeachment looms.

Following a series of sexual misconduct allegations made against Kevin Spacey in October 2017, Netflix fired the actor, making the fifth season his final appearance in the series. It consists of 13 episodes and was followed up by a final sixth season released in 2018.

Production
Casting began for the season on June 17, 2016. Filming had begun by July 20, 2016, and finished by February 14, 2017.

On January 28, 2016, Netflix renewed House of Cards for a fifth season. It was also announced that series creator Beau Willimon would step down as showrunner following the fourth season. It was announced in February 2016 that Melissa James Gibson and Frank Pugliese, who both joined the show in the third season, would serve as co-showrunners for the fifth season. In October 2016, it was announced that Patricia Clarkson and Campbell Scott had been cast for the fifth season. The first trailer for the season was released on May 1, 2017. The season was released on May 30, 2017.

Cast
 Kevin Spacey as Francis J. Underwood, the President of the United States
 Robin Wright as Claire Underwood, First Lady of the United States, former United States Ambassador to the United Nations, Democratic Vice Presidential Nominee, Vice President of the United States and the President of the United States 
 Michael Kelly as Douglas "Doug" Stamper, the White House Chief of Staff
 Campbell Scott as Mark Usher, top-level Republican campaign adviser and strategist
 Patricia Clarkson as Jane Davis, Deputy Under Secretary of Commerce for International Trade
 Paul Sparks as Thomas Yates, speechwriter and Claire Underwood's lover
 Derek Cecil as Seth Grayson, the White House Press Secretary
 Neve Campbell as LeAnn Harvey, a Texas-based political consultant, the Underwood campaign manager 
 Joel Kinnaman as Will Conway, the Republican nominee for president and Governor of New York 
 Dominique McElligott as Hannah Conway, wife of New York Governor and Republican presidential nominee Will Conway
 Boris McGiver as Tom Hammerschmidt, an editor at The Washington Herald and Lucas Goodwin's former boss 
 Korey Jackson as Sean Jeffries, a young reporter at The Washington Herald working under Hammerschmidt
 Jayne Atkinson as Catherine Durant, Secretary of State
 Colm Feore as General Ted Brockhart, Republican Vice-Presidential Nominee
 Damian Young as Aidan Macallan, a data scientist and NSA contractor who is friends with LeAnn Harvey
 James Martinez as Alex Romero, a Democratic congressman from Arizona
 Michel Gill as Garrett Walker, the former President of the United States and Frank's predecessor
 Gerald McRaney as Raymond Tusk, former associate of President Walker's and Frank's adversary 
 Larry Pine as Bob Birch, the House Minority Leader and a Democratic U.S. Representative from Michigan
 Curtiss Cook as Terry Womack, the House Minority Whip
 Lars Mikkelsen as Viktor Petrov, the President of the Russian Federation
 Wendy Moniz as Laura Moretti, widow of a liver transplant candidate
 Reed Birney as Donald Blythe, the Vice President of the United States
 Malcolm Madera as Eric Rawlings, a Civil War reenactor and personal trainer
 Kate Lyn Sheil as Lisa Williams, a girlfriend of Rachel Posner's before Rachel's death
 Jeremy Holm as Agent Nathan Green, the Deputy Director of the FBI 
 Kim Dickens as Kate Baldwin, a journalist and former White House Correspondent for the Wall Street Telegraph
 Dan Ziskie as Jim Matthews, former Vice President of the United States and Governor of Pennsylvania.

Episodes

Reception

Critical response
On Rotten Tomatoes, the season has an approval rating of 72% based on 36 reviews, with an average rating of 7.46/10. The consensus reads, "House of Cards enjoys a confident return to form this season, though its outlandish edge is tempered slightly by the current political climate." On Metacritic, the season has a weighted average score of 60 out of 100, based on 11 critics, indicating "mixed or average reviews".

Accolades
House of Cards received four major nominations for the 69th Primetime Emmy Awards, including Outstanding Drama Series, Kevin Spacey for Outstanding Lead Actor in a Drama Series, Robin Wright for Outstanding Lead Actress in a Drama Series, and Michael Kelly for Outstanding Supporting Actor in a Drama Series.

Controversy
Following the fifth season's release during early production of the sixth season in October 2017, sexual misconduct allegations against Kevin Spacey surfaced. Netflix briefly halted production and made the decision in November 2017 to part ways with the actor, marking the fifth season as his final appearance in the series.

References

External links

House of Cards (American TV series) seasons
2017 American television seasons